Wolverton railway station serves the town of Wolverton in Milton Keynes, Buckinghamshire, England. The station is one of the seven stations serving the Milton Keynes urban area.

The station has four platforms, of which just two (3 and 4) are normally in use. The station serves the northern areas of Milton Keynes (including Wolverton itself, the nearby town of Stony Stratford and the village of New Bradwell) as well as the nearby villages in West Northamptonshire.

Facilities
There is a ticket office but it is only open on weekday mornings. 

Although categorised as "step-free access category B3", this station is not realistically accessible for passengers with mobility impairments because all but one of the platforms are only reachable by long stairways.

History

Station building

The first station was built for the opening of the London and Birmingham Railway on 17 September 1838, on the embankment just north of the canal above Wolverton Park. It proved to be temporary as the railway company purchased an additional 13.5 acres to the south, where they built a larger, more permanent station in 1840, at the east end of Church Street. The new station included refreshment rooms which employed a full-time staff of 22 in 1849.  A hotel was planned but never built. The waiting room was lavishly redecorated for the visit of Queen Victoria in 1844, who spent that Christmas as the guest of the Duke of Buckingham and Chandos. In 1881, the main line was re-routed a little to the east (see 'Wolverton bend' below) to allow for expansion of the Wolverton Works and a new station opened in August 1881.  The ticket hall was a wooden building on a new bridge above the railway line and passengers needed to reach the platforms via flights of stairs. The wooden station stood here for over 100 years until British Rail demolished it in about 1990. 

For many years after the wooden station building was demolished, Wolverton railway station was a temporary shed in the car park at track level. A new brick building to replace it was finally opened on 21 June 2012. The new building is also at track level and access to all but the adjacent platform is via stairs.

In mid September 2012, the Transport Minister Norman Baker announced in a written answer that the Government had approved London Midland's request to reduce the opening hours of the new ticket office, from the previous 06:00  12:00 to 06:15  11:00 henceforth.

In 2016, a coffee and snack kiosk opened in the new station booking hall. As of late June 2022, the coffee and snack kiosk has gone and the booking hall appears to be closed.

Wolverton Works

The 1833 Act of Parliament approving the London and Birmingham Railway included a clause that specified that a railway works be built around the mid-point, as it was considered scientifically unsafe at the time for railway locomotives to move more than  without further inspection. After surveying all possible sites, Wolverton was chosen due to its co-location alongside the wharfing facilities of the Grand Union Canal, thereby also enabling the railway company to gain an easy agreement to build a viaduct over the canal company's land at this point. Provision of refreshment facilities for passengers availing of the stop was (at least initially) the primary purpose of the station, located as it was in (at the time) a very rural area.

Wolverton bend and Northampton Loop
With the advent of fast trains, Wolverton gained notoriety among railwaymen for its famously tight curve. The curve was a result of the station and main line being moved eastward in 1881, to permit extension of the Wolverton Works.  The path of the original route remains in place through the Works site and includes Robert Stephenson's (Grade II* listed) bridge over the Grand Union Canal. The Advanced Passenger Train failed its trials here in the early 1990s but the Pendolino tilting trains passed them in the early 2000s.

Wolverton Viaduct

To cross the valley of the River Great Ouse a little to the north, the company built a six-arch viaduct in 1838, at a cost then of £38,000. The viaduct was also designed by Robert Stephenson and is described by Historic England in its Grade II listing as "the most impressive of the several viaducts on the line, being taller, more elaborately treated and with wider arches. It was one of the principal landmarks of the first trunk railway and one of the earliest viaducts on this scale".

Newport Pagnell Branch Line (closed) 

From 1865 to 1964, there was a branch line from Wolverton to Newport Pagnell, primarily for employees of Wolverton Works. In 1964 the line was closed to passengers by the Beeching cuts and freight ceased in 1967. Between 1817 and 1864, the section from Great Linford to Newport Pagnell was an arm of the Grand Junction Canal which was then drained to become the track-bed. The route from Wolverton to Newport Pagnell is now a redway. Along the redway, the platforms at New Bradwell and Great Linford are still in place, as are a signal post at Newport Pagnell and an iron bridge taking the line (now the redway) over the Grand Union Canal.

Accidents
In 1847, an accident just south of the (original) station caused the deaths of seven people.

Services
Wolverton is served by trains operated by London Northwestern Railway. The typical off-peak service is:
 2 tph to 
 2 tph to  via

Platforms
The station has four platforms, of which just two are normally in use. Platforms 1 and 2 are the 'fast' lines and trains very rarely stop here: they are used by London Northwestern only during works and Avanti West Coast in emergency. Platforms 3 and 4 are used frequently by London Northwestern: Avanti West Coast services pass these platforms (without stopping) only during works.

Access to platforms is via long flights of stairs to a pedestrian overbridge, making the station unusable for people with mobility impairment.

Location

The station is at the eastern end of Wolverton, near the junction of Stratford Rd with Grafton Street. The nearest post-code is MK125FR.

See also

 Wolverton railway works
 Wolverton and Stony Stratford Tramway
 Denbigh Hall railway station: Pending construction of a viaduct over the River Ouse, passengers alighted at Denbigh Hall and transferred to horse-drawn coaches to Rugby station via the Watling Street turnpike.

References

Notes

External links

 Pendolino rounds Wolverton bend (before coming to a stop at Milton Keynes Central)

Railway stations in Buckinghamshire
DfT Category E stations
Former London and Birmingham Railway stations
Railway stations in Great Britain opened in 1881
Railway stations served by West Midlands Trains
1881 establishments in England
Wolverton
Railway stations in Milton Keynes
Buildings_and_structures_in_Milton_Keynes
Stations on the West Coast Main Line